Ossi Ensio Kauppi (19 April 1929 in Tampere, Finland – 16 April 2000) was a professional ice hockey player who played in the SM-liiga.  He played for Ilves and Tappara.  He was inducted into the Finnish Hockey Hall of Fame in 1985.

External links
 Finnish Hockey Hall of Fame bio

1929 births
2000 deaths
Ilves players
Ice hockey players at the 1952 Winter Olympics
Olympic ice hockey players of Finland
Ice hockey people from Tampere
Tappara players